The 1901 Davidson football team was an American football team that represented the Davidson College as an independent during the 1901 college football season. In their second year under head coach John A. Brewin, the team compiled a 4–2 record.

Schedule

References

Davidson
Davidson Wildcats football seasons
Davidson football